The Ukrainian Second League Cup was a knockout cup competition in Ukrainian football, run by the Professional Football League of Ukraine. 

Created in 1999 to qualify its winner and finalist for the national cup (Ukrainian Cup), after the 2000-01 season it was discontinued.

Format
The format of this competition fluctuated insignificantly. It consisted of a qualification round that was followed by the first round, 1/16 of final. Initially all rounds from the first to semi-finals consisted of two games, home-away basis, later it changed with only one game played from the randomly chosen field of the participated clubs. Mainly the competition was limited to clubs that were competing in the Second League. Also later semifinalists were allowed to enter the Ukrainian Cup also. The winner and runner-up of the competition were awarded a qualification to the Ukrainian Cup in 2000 and 2001.

History
The competition with name Cup of the Second League began in 1999/2000 season by the PFL, but after the second season 2000/2001 decided to abandon them. The competition was discontinued as it showed to be lacking the true strive for victory from the clubs that participated. It was lacking popularization and was also considered to be more costly as almost no spectators were attending the games of that competition.

Finals

Performance by club

See also 
Football in Ukraine
Ukrainian Premier League

External links 
Football Federation of Ukraine (Ukrainian)
First edition of the Cup 
Second edition of the Cup 

 
Second League Cup
Defunct football competitions in Ukraine
Cup
Recurring sporting events established in 1999
1999 establishments in Ukraine
2001 disestablishments in Ukraine
Recurring sporting events disestablished in 2001